Kabir Sadanand  is an Indian actor and film director.

Films

Television

Notes

References

External links
 
 

Living people
Film directors from Mumbai
Male actors from Mumbai
Male actors in Hindi cinema
Indian male television actors
21st-century Indian male actors
Indian male soap opera actors
Year of birth missing (living people)